The 8th European Film Awards were presented on 12 November 1995 in Berlin, Germany. The winners were selected by the members of the European Film Academy.

Awards

Best Film

Best Documentary

Lifetime Achievement Award

References

External links 
 European Film Academy Archive

1995 film awards
European Film Awards ceremonies
1995 in Germany
1995 in Europe